In enzymology, a maltose α-D-glucosyltransferase is an enzyme that catalyzes the chemical reaction

maltose  alpha,alpha-trehalose

Hence, this enzyme has one substrate, maltose, and one product, alpha,alpha-trehalose.

This enzyme belongs to the family of isomerases, specifically those intramolecular transferases transferring other groups.  The systematic name of this enzyme class is maltose alpha-D-glucosylmutase. Other names in common use include trehalose synthase, and maltose glucosylmutase.  This enzyme participates in starch and sucrose metabolism.

References

 
 

EC 5.4.99
Enzymes of unknown structure